This list provides an overview of the locomotives and railcars of the Portuguese railways, that is, the traction stock of earlier private railways, the state-owned Comboios de Portugal (CP) and its predecessor, the municipal Metropolitano Ligeiro de Mirandela and the two private transport companies Fertagus and Takargo Rail.

Broad gauge steam locomotives

Companhia Central e Peninsular dos Caminhos de Ferro em Portugal (CCeP) 

Originally 1440 mm gauge; taken over by the Companhia Real dos Caminhos de Ferro Portugueses in 1857; regauged to 1672 mm in 1860.

South Eastern of Portugal Railway (SEPR)

1440 mm gauge
Built by British investors; also known by its Portuguese name Companhia dos Caminhos de Ferro do Sul e Sueste (SeS). Regauged to 1672 mm in 1869; nationalised and renamed Caminhos de Ferro do Estado (CFE) in 1869

1672 mm gauge

Caminhos de Ferro Estado Minho e Douro (MD) 
1672 mm gauge

Companhia dos Caminhos de Ferro Portugueses da Beira Alta (BA) 
1672 mm gauge; absorbed by Companhia dos Caminhos de Ferro Portugueses in 1947.

Companhia Real dos Caminhos de Ferro Portugueses (CP) 

Renamed Companhia dos Caminhos de Ferro de Portugueses in 1910.
1672 mm gauge

Narrow gauge steam locomotives

Companhia dos Caminhos de Ferro do Norte de Portugal (NP) 
1000 mm gauge

Companhia National de Caminhos de Ferro (CN) 
1000 mm gauge

Caminhos de Ferro do Estado Minho e Douro (MD) 
1000 mm gauge

Companhia de Caminho de Ferro do Valle de Vouga (VV) 
1000 mm gauge

Porto - Povoa e Famalicão (PPF) 
900 mm gauge

Electric locomotives

Diesel locomotives

Electric multiple units

Diesel multiple units

References

External links 

 Overview of the Portuguese classes by railfaneurope.net
 Further overview of the Portuguese classes

 
 
Railway locomotive-related lists
Locomotives and railcars

pt:Predefinição:FerroviasPTmotor